Mekong Delta Development Research Institute (MDI) is an institute in Can Tho, Vietnam. Established in 1976, it is an interdisciplinary training and research organization  of Can Tho University in the Mekong Delta. The main function of the institute is to train human resources for the Mekong delta in rural development and farming system.  The second important activity of the institute is doing scientific research.

Staff
At present, the total number of MDI staff is around 35, including 20 lecturers (04 Assoc. Profs, 07 PhDs and 09 Masters).

Function

Education and Training
The current training capacity of MDI is more than 500 students involving full-time undergraduate and postgraduate students, including 2 main majors:
 Rural Development: bachelor, master and doctor degree
 Agricultural System: master's degree

In addition, MDI cooperates with local authorities to organize more than 100 training courses per year for local officials about:
 Rice producing, breeding and selecting techniques
 Farming Systems Research/Extension
 Techniques for new rural development communes
 Other techniques about livelihood assessment and value chain

Research
The Institute pays attention to the following research areas:  
 Food security
 Agricultural resources management
 Rural development
 Urban development
 Climate change adaptation
 Policies and governance in agricultural and rural aspects

Organizational structure
Up to now, Mekong Delta Development Research Institute (MDI) has 03 departments, 01 Center and an Administration office.

 Department of Agriculture System
 of Crop Resource Management
 Department of Socio Economic Policy Studies
 Research and Training Center for Rural professions

Research institutes in Vietnam